Dubové (until 1899 ) is a village and municipality in Turčianske Teplice District in the Žilina Region of northern central Slovakia.

History
In historical records the village was first mentioned in 1262.

Geography
The municipality lies at an altitude of 487 metres and covers an area of 28.294 km2. It has a population of about 758 people.

Genealogical resources

The records for genealogical research are available at the state archive "Statny Archiv in Bytca, Slovakia"

 Roman Catholic church records (births/marriages/deaths): 1690-1896 (parish B)
 Lutheran church records (births/marriages/deaths): 1715-1895 (parish B)

See also
 List of municipalities and towns in Slovakia

References

External links
Surnames of living people in Dubove

Villages and municipalities in Turčianske Teplice District